Milton Raphael Guimarães Pires (born 11 May 1991) is a Brazilian professional footballer who plays as a goalkeeper.

Professional career
Raphael made his professional debut with Botafogo in a 5-2 Campeonato Carioca loss to Boavista-RJ on 23 April 2011. On 29 June 2018, Raphael moved to Vitória Setúbal in the Portuguese Primeira Liga.

References

External links
 
 Profile

1991 births
Living people
People from Volta Redonda
Brazilian footballers
Brazilian expatriate footballers
Vitória F.C. players
Associação Atlética Portuguesa (RJ) players
Boavista Sport Club players
Botafogo de Futebol e Regatas players
Joinville Esporte Clube players
Volta Redonda FC players
Caxias Futebol Clube players
Sampaio Corrêa Futebol Clube players
Macaé Esporte Futebol Clube players
Primeira Liga players
Campeonato Brasileiro Série A players
Campeonato Brasileiro Série C players
Association football goalkeepers
Brazilian expatriate sportspeople in Portugal
Expatriate footballers in Portugal
Sportspeople from Rio de Janeiro (state)